Bagsy Me is the fourth album by Swedish band The Wannadies, released in 1997.

It includes the hit singles "Someone Somewhere", "Shorty", "Friends", "Hit" and "You and Me Song", the last being originally available on previous album Be A Girl.  The song was not re-recorded and is present to capitalise on the band's growing fame following the track's appearance on the soundtrack to Baz Luhrmann's 1996 film Romeo + Juliet. The album was released in revised form in the US as The Wannadies.

The CD version also features a pre-gap 'hidden track', which is the album versions of "Silent People" and "Bumble Bee Boy" played at the same time (both tracks feature on this album normally, as tracks 7 and 10) . Silent People is panned to the left, with Bumble Bee Boy panned to the right and starting 4 seconds later. The two songs feature the same music and some similar lyrics, but due to their differing tempos, they only sync up for a single line (the first 'how about you', in the first chorus of both songs).

Track listing

Personnel 
 Christina Bergmark: Keyboards, Vocals
 Gunnar Karlsson: Drums
 Nille Perned: Recorder, Producer
 Fredrik Schonfeldt: Bass
 Stefan Schönfeldt: Guitar
 Per Sunding: Producer
 Pär Wiksten: Guitar, Vocals

References

External links
Official Wannadies website

The Wannadies albums
1997 albums